"Gotta Learn to Love Without You" is a song co-written and recorded by American country pop artist Michael Johnson.  It was released in April 1986 as the first single from the album Wings.  The song reached #12 on the Billboard Hot Country Singles & Tracks chart.  Johnson wrote the song with Kent Robbins.

Chart performance

References

1986 singles
1986 songs
Michael Johnson (singer) songs
Songs written by Kent Robbins
Songs written by Michael Johnson (singer)
RCA Records singles
Song recordings produced by Brent Maher